The P.C. Hooft Award (in Dutch: P.C. Hooft-prijs), inaugurated in 1948, is a Dutch-language literary lifetime-achievement award named after 17th-century Dutch poet and playwright Pieter Corneliszoon Hooft. The award is made annually.

Background
Established in 1948, initially as an award of the state, winners are selected from alternating categories: prose (fiction), essays (non-fiction) and poetry. Winners of the prize receive .

In 1984, the relationship between the State of the Netherlands and the independent Foundation that puts forward the winner came under pressure when the jury nominated columnist Hugo Brandt Corstius. The Minister of Culture at the time, Elco Brinkman, refused to award the prize to Corstius because of Corstius' perceived inappropriate comments against the government and the then Prime Minister Ruud Lubbers. As a result of the uproar, the prize was not awarded in 1984, 1985 and 1986. In 1987, with a re-established fully independent committee, the prize was as yet awarded to Corstius.

Award winners

 1947 – Amoene van Haersolte 
 1947 – Arthur van Schendel 
 1948 – A. M. Hammacher 
 1949 – Gerrit Achterberg 
 1950 – Simon Vestdijk 
 1951 – E. J. Dijksterhuis 
 1952 – J. C. Bloem 
 1953 – Ferdinand Bordewijk 
 1954 – L. J. Rogier 
 1955 – Adriaan Roland Holst 
 1956 – Anna Blaman 
 1957 – Pieter Geyl 
 1958 – Pierre Kemp 
 1959 – not awarded 
 1960 – Victor E. van Vriesland 
 1961 – H. W. J. M. Keuls 
 1962 – Theun de Vries 
 1963 – F. G. L. van der Meer 
 1964 – Leo Vroman 
 1965 – not awarded 
 1966 – Anton van Duinkerken 
 1967 – Lucebert 
 1968 – Gerard Kornelis van het Reve 
 1969 – not awarded 
 1970 – Gerrit Kouwenaar 
 1971 – Willem Frederik Hermans (award refused) 
 1972 – Abel J. Herzberg 
 1973 – Hendrik de Vries 
 1974 – Simon Carmiggelt 
 1975 – Rudy Kousbroek 
 1976 – Remco Campert 
 1977 – Harry Mulisch 
 1978 – Cornelis Verhoeven 
 1979 – Ida Gerhardt 
 1980 – Willem Brakman 
 1981 – Karel van het Reve 
 1982 – M. Vasalis 
 1983 – Hella S. Haasse 
 1984 – not awarded 
 1985 – not awarded 
 1986 – not awarded 
 1987 – Hugo Brandt Corstius 
 1988 – Rutger Kopland 
 1989 – Jan Wolkers (award refused) 
 1990 – Kees Fens 
 1991 – Elisabeth Eybers 
 1992 – Anton Koolhaas 
 1993 – Gerrit Komrij 
 1994 – J. Bernlef 
 1995 – A. Alberts 
 1996 – K. Schippers 
 1997 – Judith Herzberg 
 1998 – F. B. Hotz 
 1999 – Arthur Lehning 
 2000 – Eva Gerlach
 2001 – Gerrit Krol
 2002 – Sem Dresden
 2003 – H. H. ter Balkt
 2004 – Cees Nooteboom
 2005 – Frédéric Bastet
 2006 – H. C. ten Berge
 2007 – Maarten Biesheuvel
 2008 – Abram de Swaan
 2009 – Hans Verhagen
 2010 – Charlotte Mutsaers
 2011 – H. J. A. Hofland
 2012 – Tonnus Oosterhoff
 2013 – A. F. Th. van der Heijden
 2014 – Willem Jan Otten
 2015 – Anneke Brassinga
 2016 – Astrid Roemer
 2017 – Bas Heijne
 2018 - Nachoem Wijnberg
 2019 - Marga Minco
 2020 -  Maxim Februari
 2021 - Alfred Schaffer
 2022 - Arnon Grunberg

References

External links 

 Website of the P.C. Hooft Award

1947 establishments in the Netherlands
Articles containing video clips
Awards established in 1947
Dutch literary awards
Literary awards honoring lifetime achievement